Moisselles is a commune in the Val-d'Oise department in Île-de-France in northern France. It lies 13 km north of St Denis, and about 30 km west of Paris Charles de Gaulle Airport.

See also
Communes of the Val-d'Oise department

References

External links
Association of Mayors of the Val d'Oise 

Communes of Val-d'Oise